Tritle may refer to:

 Frederick Augustus Tritle (1833–1906), American politician and Governor of Arizona Territory (1882–1885)

 Kent Tritle, American choral conductor and organist
 Mount Tritle, a peak in the Bradshaw Mountains